The Seven Deadly Sins (French: Les Sept Péchés capitaux) is a 1952 French/Italian co-production motion picture drama. The film stars Michèle Morgan, Françoise Rosay, Viviane Romance, Maurice Ronet, Louis de Funès, Isa Miranda, Henri Vidal and Gérard Philipe. It has seven separate sections:  ("Pride/L'Orgueil", "Lust/La Luxure", "Sloth/La Paresse", "Envy/L'Envie", "Avarice and Anger/L'Avarice et la colère", "Gluttony/La Gourmandise", "The Eighth Sin/Le Huitième péché") with five episodes from France, and two episodes from Italy.

Director
Claude Autant-Lara (segment "Pride")
Yves Allégret (segment "Lust")
Jean Dréville (segment "Sloth")
Roberto Rossellini (segment "Envy")
Eduardo De Filippo (segment "Avarice and Anger")
Carlo Rim (segment "Gluttony")
Georges Lacombe (segment "The Eighth Sin")

Writer
Diego Fabbri
Liana Ferri
Léo Joannon
Turi Vasile
René Wheeler
Claude Autant-Lara (segment "Pride")
Jean Aurenche (segments "Pride", "Lust", "The Eighth Sin")
Pierre Bost (segments "Pride", "Lust", "The Eighth Sin")
Carlo Rim (segments "Sloth", "Gluttony")
Roberto Rossellini (segment "Envy")
Charles Spaak (segment "Avarice and Anger")

References

External links

The Seven Deadly Sins at Film de France

1952 films
Films based on works by Colette
Films based on works by Jules Barbey d'Aurevilly
Films directed by Claude Autant-Lara
Films directed by Yves Allégret
Films directed by Jean Dréville
Films directed by Roberto Rossellini
Films directed by Eduardo De Filippo
Films with screenplays by Jean Aurenche
Films with screenplays by Pierre Bost
Seven deadly sins in popular culture
French drama films
Italian drama films
1952 drama films
Italian black-and-white films
French black-and-white films
1950s French films
1950s Italian films